Roger Becker (6 February 1934 – 6 November 2017) was a British tennis player. Besides tennis, Becker competed in cricket, football, and golf; all were well within his grasp. However, in 1949 he chose tennis to the dismay of the players of the other sports. In 1952, Becker played in the Davis Cup at 18 years of age, the youngest British player to have done so at the time. His record stood until 2005 when it was broken by Andy Murray at the age of 17. He later served as Paul Hutchins' coach for a time.

References

External links
Guardian article

1934 births
2017 deaths
English male tennis players
British male tennis players
Tennis people from Greater London
Professional tennis players before the Open Era